2018 Missouri Proposition A was a veto referendum ballot measure held on August 7, 2018, to determine whether to uphold or overturn a right-to-work law passed by the Missouri General Assembly in 2017. The law was defeated, resulting in its repeal.

Background
Right-to-work laws prohibit requiring employees who are not union members to contribute to the costs of union representation. Right-to-work legislation had been previously passed by the Missouri General Assembly in 2015, but was vetoed by Democratic governor Jay Nixon. Following the election of Republican governor Eric Greitens in 2016, the Assembly again passed a right-to-work law, which was signed by Greitens. However, opponents of the law gathered enough signatures to force a veto referendum, preventing it from going into effect until the referendum was held.

Contents
The proposition appeared on the ballot as follows:

A lawsuit was filed in Cole County to change the ballot title, arguing that using the word "adopt" was misleading, given that the law had already been passed by the General Assembly. Circuit court judge Daniel Green ruled in favor of the plaintiffs, re-writing the ballot title. The case was appealed to the Western District of the Missouri Court of Appeals, which reversed the initial ruling.

Results
The law was defeated in a landslide, with a 67.5% of voters voting to repeal it.

References

External links

2018 Missouri elections
2018 ballot measures
Missouri ballot measures
Right-to-work law